"Johnny B. Goode" is a 1958 rock song written and first recorded by Chuck Berry. Released as a single, it peaked at number two on Billboard magazine's Hot R&B Sides chart and number eight on its pre-Hot 100 chart.

"Johnny B. Goode" is considered one of the most recognizable songs in the history of popular music. Credited as "the first rock & roll hit about rock & roll stardom", it has been recorded by many other artists and has received several honors and accolades, including being ranked seventh on Rolling Stones list of the "500 Greatest Songs of All Time" and included as one of the 27 songs on the Voyager Golden Record, a collection of music, images, and sounds designed to serve as a record of humanity.

Composition and recording 
Written by Berry in 1955, the song is about a semi-literate "country boy" from the New Orleans area, who plays a guitar "just like ringing a bell", and who might one day have his "name in lights". Berry acknowledged that the song is partly autobiographical and that the original lyrics referred to Johnny as a "colored boy", but he changed it to "country boy" to ensure radio play. As well as suggesting that the guitar player is good, the title hints at autobiographic elements, because Berry was born at 2520 Goode Avenue, in St. Louis.

The song was initially inspired by Johnnie Johnson, the regular piano player in Berry's band, but developed into a song mainly about Berry himself. Johnson played on many recordings by Berry, but for the Chess recording session Lafayette Leake played the piano, along with Willie Dixon on bass and Fred Below on drums. The session was produced by Leonard and Phil Chess.

The opening guitar riff of "Johnny B. Goode" borrows from the opening single-note solo on Louis Jordan's "Ain't That Just Like a Woman" (1946), played by guitarist Carl Hogan.

Legacy

In The Guardian, Joe Queenan wrote that "Johnny B. Goode" is "probably the first song ever written about how much money a musician could make by playing the guitar", and argued that "no song in the history of rock'n'roll more jubilantly celebrates the downmarket socioeconomic roots of the genre". In Billboard, Jason Lipshutz stated that the song was "the first rock-star origin story", and that it featured "a swagger and showmanship that had not yet invaded radio."

When Chuck Berry was inducted during the first Rock and Roll Hall of Fame induction ceremony on January 23, 1986, he performed "Johnny B. Goode" and "Rock and Roll Music", backed by Bruce Springsteen and the E Street Band. The Hall of Fame included these songs and "Maybellene" in their list of the 500 songs that shaped rock and roll. It was inducted into the Grammy Hall of Fame in 1999, for its influence as a rock and roll single.

"Johnny B. Goode"  has been recorded by a wide variety of artists in different genres. In 1969, country musician Buck Owens's version topped Billboard magazine's Hot Country Sides chart.  In 1972, Jimi Hendrix had a posthumous hit with a live version, which peaked at number 35 on the UK Singles Chart. and number 13 on the New Zealand Top 50 in 1986. Peter Tosh's rendition peaked at number 84 on the Billboard Hot 100, number 48 on the UK Singles Chart, number 10 in the Netherlands, and number 29 in New Zealand in 1983. In 1988, Judas Priest's version reached number 64 on the UK Singles Chart. The Sex Pistols also covered it for their soundtrack The Great Rock 'n' Roll Swindle in 1979.

The song is included, as the eleventh track of disc 1, in the Voyager Golden Record, travelling into deep space outside the solar system.

A cover version is included in the film Back to the Future, when the lead character Marty McFly plays it at a high school dance. Actor Michael J. Fox explained his approach to "incorporate all the characteristics and mannerisms and quirks of my favourite guitarists, so a Pete Townshend windmill, and Jimi Hendrix behind the back, and a Chuck Berry duckwalk. And we worked all that in."  Reviewer Gregory Wakeman described it as "one of the best musical performances in movie history".

Accolades

Charts and certifications

Certifications

References

1958 songs
1958 singles
1969 singles
1972 singles
1979 singles
1983 singles
1988 singles
Songs written by Chuck Berry
Chuck Berry songs
The Beatles songs
Buck Owens songs
Jimi Hendrix songs
Judas Priest songs
Leif Garrett songs
Grammy Hall of Fame Award recipients
Chess Records singles
Columbia Records singles
Songs about fictional male characters
Songs about musicians
Songs about guitars
Songs about rock music
Songs about New Orleans
Contents of the Voyager Golden Record
Songs about fame